José Hernán Barrera Escobar (born 9 February 1988) is a Chilean footballer who is as a free agent.

Controversies
In 2021, he joined Deportes Concepción in the Chilean Segunda División, but he was fired along with his teammate Yerko Rojas due to have taken part in a party at a Deportes Concepción's department in Nonguén, Biobío Region, in the context of COVID-19 pandemic.

Honours

International
Chile U21
 Toulon Tournament (1): 2009

References

External links
 
 

1988 births
Living people
People from Santiago
People from Santiago Province, Chile
People from Santiago Metropolitan Region
Footballers from Santiago
Chilean footballers
Chile youth international footballers
Santiago Morning footballers
Everton de Viña del Mar footballers
Unión La Calera footballers
Magallanes footballers
Deportes Magallanes footballers
Cobreloa footballers
Rangers de Talca footballers
Lautaro de Buin footballers
Deportes Concepción (Chile) footballers
Chilean Primera División players
Primera B de Chile players
Segunda División Profesional de Chile players
Association football midfielders